Grasser is a surname of German origin, meaning "to scream behave in a high-spirited way", referring to an irascible person or complainer. Notable people with the surname include:

Anton Grasser (1891-1976), German general
Elisabeth Grasser (1904-2002), Austrian fencer
Erasmus Grasser (c. 1450-c. 1515), German master builder and sculptor
Georg Grasser (born 1990), Austrian footballer
Hartmann Grasser (1914-1986), German fighter ace
Karl-Heinz Grasser (born 1969), Austrian former politician
Tibor Grasser (born 1970), Austrian electrical engineer and professor

See also
Grasser Racing Team, an Austrian racing team
Gräser